Gershom Gorenberg is an American-born Israeli journalist, and blogger, specializing in Middle Eastern politics and the interaction of religion and politics. He is currently a senior correspondent for The American Prospect, a monthly American political magazine. Gorenberg self-identifies as "a left-wing, skeptical Orthodox Zionist Jew".

Early life and education
Gorenberg was born in St. Louis, and grew up in California. In 1977, he traveled to Israel to study, and ultimately decided to immigrate to the country, becoming an American-Israeli dual citizen.

Gorenberg graduated from the University of California at Santa Cruz, and earned his M.A. in education from the Hebrew University of Jerusalem. He lives in Jerusalem, Israel, with his wife, journalist Myra Noveck, and three children.

Career
For many years, Gorenberg served as an associate editor of The Jerusalem Report, an Israeli bi-weekly news magazine. In 1996, he edited a selected collection of Jerusalem Report essays published under the title "Seventy Facets: A Commentary on the Torah from the Pages from the Jerusalem Report", and co-authored the Jerusalem Report's biography of Yitzhak Rabin, Shalom, Friend: The Life and Legacy of Yitzhak Rabin. Gorenberg is now a senior correspondent for The American Prospect, an American political monthly.

As a published author, Gorenberg is best known for his study on the origins of Israeli settlements in Israeli-occupied territories following the 1967 Six-Day War, The Accidental Empire: Israel and the Birth of the Settlements, 1967-1977 (2006). The End of Days: Fundamentalism and the Struggle for the Temple Mount was published in 2000. In The Unmaking of Israel (2011), Gorenberg decries the settler movement and how government support for the Haredi is undermining Israeli democracy.

Gorenberg has contributed features and commentary on politics, religion, and aspects of Israeli-American relations to newspapers including The New York Times,<ref name=NYTOpEd>Israel's Tragedy Foretold. Gershom Gorenberg. The New York Times.  March 10, 2006.  Accessed March 19, 2007.</ref> Los Angeles Times, and The Washington Post.

Gorenberg blogs at South Jerusalem, together with Haim Watzman. He is a frequent guest on BloggingHeads.tv, particularly in discussions related to Israel. Gorenberg was an associate of the now-closed Center for Millennial Studies at Boston University.

Bibliography
 The Unmaking of Israel. Harper. 2011. 
 See also: Israeli settlements, Israeli culture, Israel Defense Forces
 The Accidental Empire: Israel and the Birth of the Settlements, 1967-1977. Times Press. 2006. 
 Reviews:A small dispute about a handkerchief, a piano and a piece of land . Leah Keren. The Jewish Quarterly. Autumn 2006, Number 203. Accessed March 29, 2007.
 See also: Israeli settlements
 The End of Days: Fundamentalism and the Struggle for the Temple Mount. Diane Publishing Company.  2000. 
 Reviews:
 See also: Christian Zionism, Temple Mount
 Seventy Facets: A Commentary on the Torah from the Pages of the Jerusalem Report. (Editor.) Jason Aronson Press. 1996. 
 See also: Torah
 Shalom, Friend: The Life and Legacy of Yitzhak Rabin. (Co-author.)  Newmarket Press. 1996. 
 Awards: National Jewish Book Award
 See also: Yitzhak Rabin

References

External links

 Gershom Gorenberg's Article List  (The American Prospect'')
 South Jerusalem: A Progressive, Skeptical Blog on Israel, Judaism, Culture, Politics, and Literature
 Video discussions/debates involving Gorenberg on BloggingHeads.tv

American political writers
American male non-fiction writers
Israeli political writers
American emigrants to Israel
Israeli Jews
Living people
Israeli Orthodox Jews
American Orthodox Jews
Year of birth missing (living people)
University of California, Santa Cruz alumni